Anna Mahon, née Norgren (born 19 December 1974 in Stamford, Connecticut) is a retired female hammer thrower from the United States. Her personal best is 72.01 metres, achieved in July 2002 in Walnut, California. She holds the position of Assistant Superintendent of Brookfield Schools. Mahon formerly held the position of principal at Amity Regional High School. She previously served as an English teacher, English department chairperson, and associate principal at the same school. Her husband, Sean Mahon, who still works at Amity High School, is a P. E. teacher and indoor girls' track coach.

International competitions

References

1974 births
Living people
Sportspeople from Stamford, Connecticut
American female hammer throwers
Olympic track and field athletes of the United States
Athletes (track and field) at the 2004 Summer Olympics
Pan American Games track and field athletes for the United States
Athletes (track and field) at the 2003 Pan American Games
World Athletics Championships athletes for the United States
Female weight throwers
Track and field athletes from Connecticut
21st-century American women